Escape from Hat is an upcoming computer-animated fantasy film co-written and directed by Mark Osborne, based on the children's book of the same name by Adam Kline.

Premise
Leek, a desperate and magical rabbit rallies an unexpected band of allies and undertakes an impossible quest to escape from inside a magician's hat and defeating evil black cats as Leek returns to the human boy he dearly loves.

Production

Development
In April 2017, 20th Century Fox Animation and Blue Sky Studios had announced they would produce the animated film adaptation of Adam Kline's fantasy book "Escape from Hat" with Mark Osborne set as director and co-write the script with Kline, and Jinko Gotoh producing the film along with Osborne. However, in November 2018, Netflix acquired the film rights and Melissa Cobb joined the production team.

Animation
Production of the film started in December 2018.

References

External links
 

American animated fantasy films
American children's animated adventure films
American children's animated comedy films
American children's animated fantasy films
Animated films about cats
Animated films about rabbits and hares
Animated films based on American novels
American novels adapted into films
Upcoming English-language films
Films directed by Mark Osborne
British animated fantasy films
British children's animated films
Netflix Animation films
Upcoming films
Upcoming Netflix original films